Civic Hall may refer to:
 Leeds Civic Hall in Leeds, opened 1933
 Wolverhampton Civic Hall in Wolverhampton, opened 1938
 Galleywood Civic Hall in Wolverhampton
 Civic Hall in Ballarat, Victoria, opened in 1956
 Civic Hall in Port Lincoln, South Australia
 Portland Civic Hall in Portland, Victoria
 Rye Civic Hall in Rye, Victoria
 Ryde Civic Hall in Ryde, New South Wales
 "Civic Hall", a song on the album Magnets by The Vapors

See also
Civic Center
Civic Center Historic District (disambiguation)

Architectural disambiguation pages